Mosely Creek is a large creek in the Pacific Ranges of the Coast Mountains in British Columbia, Canada, flowing southwest to join the Homathko River in its canyon downstream from Tatlayoko Lake, and a short distance above Murderers Bar at , which is the site of the opening events of the Chilcotin War of 1864.

The creek is named for Edwin Mosley or Mosely who was one of three settler survivors of the Chilcotin War of 1864. 

See also
List of British Columbia rivers

References

Rivers of the Pacific Ranges
Range 2 Coast Land District